There are three radar systems that are known as the AN/SPN-46:

 AN/SPN-46(V)1 An American carrier-based radar that was built between 1987 and 1998, in service until 2025.
 AN/SPN-46(V)2 An American ground-based radar used for training.
 AN/SPN-46(V)3 An American carrier-based radar currently under development.